The Poof Point is a Disney Channel Original Movie, based on the children's novel "The Poof Point" by Ellen Weiss, M. Friedman.

Plot
Two 40-year-old scientists, Norton (Mark Curry) and Marigold Ballard (Dawnn Lewis), invent a time machine. On one of their test runs, they attempt to send two goldfish into the 1860s. Their dog Einstein unknowingly tampers with the machine and a critical component known as the "vector modulator" falls out, causing it to not function properly. Instead of sending the goldfish into the past, the goldfish are "de-aged" until the point before they were born, known as the "Poof Point." Norton and Marigold are unaware of this as they leave to attend the graduation of their children, Eddie (Tahj Mowry) and Marie (Raquel Lee), who are embarrassed by their parents' attempts at socializing and feel disconnected from them. Eddie has also expressed interest in joining a band called the Urban Slugs, which he will audition for at his house.

The two scientists decide to perform the goldfish experiment again, but the machine's particle beam is accidentally redirected to them. Eddie and Marie come in and notice that their parents have mentally reverted to the age of 21 and believe that they are in the 1980s when they were still designing the time machine in college. Norton and Marigold realize that this was the effect of the malfunctioning time machine and start trying to fix it. But then they revert again to 14-year-olds, when they had no knowledge of the time machine they had constructed and were not in love yet. They discuss their social life as teenagers with their children but later wander off from home. At a diner, Marigold tells Chloe, a girl known for spreading rumors and gossip, that the Urban Slugs are playing at Eddie's house. Believing that this is a party and not an audition, Chloe starts inviting many kids over.

Eddie and Marie try to handle the situation, discovering that the problem with the machine is the missing vector modulator before their parents regress further into acting and dressing like 7-year-olds. The party ends after a few neighbors complain to the police about the rowdiness. However, time is running out and the children need to find the missing part and activate the machine before their parents disappear forever. This is complicated when Norton and Marigold become 2-year-olds who keep making messes, running off, and doing everything they can to cause trouble and not go into the machine to return to their normal age. The vector modulator is eventually found and the children get them into the machine right on the verge of poofing away and save their lives. After having learned that their parents were just like them as teenagers, they start to bond more.

Cast
 Tahj Mowry as Edison Newton "Eddie" Ballard
 Raquel Lee as Marie Curie Ballard
 Mark Curry as Norton Ballard
 Dawnn Lewis as Marigold Ballard
 Jan Felt as Corky
 Haley McCormick as Lizzie
 Karl Wilson as Mr. Paul
 Laura Summer as Computer Voice
 Ryan Seaman as Gabe
 Peter Van Dyke ad Edison's Double

External links
 

Disney Channel Original Movie films
2001 television films
2001 films
Films directed by Neal Israel
American science fiction comedy films
2000s science fiction comedy films
2000s English-language films
2000s American films